Stary Shardak (İśke Şarźaq) is a rural locality (a village) in Kaltyayevsky Selsoviet, Tatyshlinsky District, Bashkortostan, Russia. The population was 85 as of 2010. There is 1 street.

Geography 
Stary Shardak is located 11 km northeast of Verkhniye Tatyshly (the district's administrative centre) by road. Verkhnyaya Salayevka is the nearest rural locality.

References 

Rural localities in Tatyshlinsky District